Seán Condon (11 June 1923 – 27 October 2001) was an Irish hurler who played as a centre-forward at senior level for the Cork county team.

Condon joined the team during the 1942 championship and was a regular member of the starting fifteen until his retirement after the 1951 championship. During that time he won three All-Ireland medals and three Munster medals. An All-Ireland runner-up on one occasion, Condon captained Cork to a fourth successive All-Ireland title in 1944.

At club level Condon was a four-time county club championship medalist with St Finbarr's.

Playing career

Club
Condon played his club hurling with St Finbarr's and had much success.

He first played for the famous "Barr's" club in the minor grade and collected three successive championship medals in that grade between 1939 and 1941.

In 1942 Condon played in his first senior county final with "the Barr's". Ballincollig, a team who had defeated nine-in-a-row hopefuls Glen Rovers in the semi-final, provided the opposition. St Finbarr's made no mistake and powered to a 5–7 to 2–2. It was Condon's first championship medal.

Both St Finbarr's and Ballincollig met in the championship decider again the following year. A 3–3 apiece draw, thanks to a late goal by Condon, was the result on that occasion, however, St. Finbarr's made no mistake in the replay and powered to a 7–9 to 1–1 victory. It was Condon's second championship medal.

Three-in-a-row proved beyond St Finbarr's as Glen Rovers claimed victory in the championship decider in 1944. Both sides lined out in opposition to each other again two years later. Condon was singled out for special praise and collected a third championship medal following a 2–3 to 2–1 defeat of their north side rivals.

Twelve months later St Finbarr's put their title on the line against Sarsfield's in the county decider. A record crowd saw "Sars" lead "the Barr's" by a single point as the game entered injury time. They failed to clear a seventy which was flicked to the net by Jim Sargent to give St Finbarr's a 4–6 to 4–4 victory. It was Condon's fourth and final championship medal.

Inter-county
Condon first came to prominence on the inter-county scene as a member of the Cork minor hurling team in 1940. His first season on the team was unsuccessful, however, in 1941 Condon was appointed captain of the side. He won a Munster medal that year following a 4–6 to 3–3 defeat of Tipperary. Condon later led his team to an All-Ireland decider against Kilkenny. A 5–2 to 2–2 score line gave Cork the victory and gave Condon an All-Ireland Minor Hurling Championship medal.

In 1942 Condon made his senior championship debut in a Munster semi-final defeat of Limerick. He won his first Munster that year as Tipp were downed by 4–15 to 4–1 in the subsequent provincial decider. The All-Ireland final was a replay of the previous year with Dublin providing the opposition once again. The game was a close affair with just a point separating the sides at the three-quarter stage. In the end Cork won comfortably enough by 2–14 to 3–4 and Condon collected his first All-Ireland medal.

Condon missed Cork's Munster final triumph, however, he later lined out in a second All-Ireland decider with Antrim becoming the first Ulster side to qualify for a final. Unfortunately, the occasion got to the Glensmen as Cork built up an unassailable 3–11 to 0–2 half-time lead. The final score of 5–16 to 0–4 gave Cork their second-ever hat-trick of All-Ireland titles while it also gave Condon a second All-Ireland medal.

In 1944 Condon was appointed captain of the team as Cork were attempting to capture a fourth All-Ireland title in-a-row. No team in the history of the hurling championship had won more than three consecutive titles. The year got off to a good start when Cork defeated Limerick by 4–6 to 3–6 after a replay to give Condon a second Munster medal. For the third time in four years Cork faced Dublin in an All-Ireland decider. Joe Kelly was the hero of the day and he contributed greatly to Cork's 2–13 to 1–2 victory. It was a third successive All-Ireland medal for Condon while he also had the honour of lifting the Liam MacCarthy Cup.

Five-in-a-row proved to be a bridge too far for Cork in 1945, while Condon was later dropped from the starting fifteen for Cork's successful championship campaign the following year.

Condon was back on the starting fifteen again in 1947 and picked up a third Munster medal following a three-point victory over Limerick. The All-Ireland final was a repeat of the previous year with Kilkenny providing the opposition. The stakes were high for both sides as Cork were aiming for a record sixth championship in seven seasons while Kilkenny were aiming to avoid becoming the first team to lose three consecutive All-Ireland finals. In what has been described as one of the greatest deciders of all-time, little separated the two teams over the course if the hour.  A Joe Kelly goal put Cork one point ahead with time almost up, however, Terry Leahy proved to be the hero of the day. He converted a free to level the sides again before sending over the match-winner from the subsequent puck-out. With that the game was over and Condon's side were beaten by 0–14 to 2–7. It was the fifth time that Kilkenny had pipped Cork by a single point in an All-Ireland final.

That defeat saw the break-up of the great four-in-a-row team of the 1940s and was followed by four lean years of championship hurling for Cork.  Three consecutive defeats by Tipperary in 1949, 1950 and 1951 proved too much and Condon retired from inter-county hurling in 1951.

Inter-provincial
Condon also had the honour of being selected for Munster in the inter-provincial series of games and captained the province for his one season on the team. A 4–10 to 4–4 defeat of Connacht in 1944 gave Condon his sole Railway Cup medal.

Honours

St Finbarr's 
Cork Senior Club Hurling Championship: 1942, 1943, 1946, 1947

Cork
All-Ireland Senior Hurling Championship (4): 1942, 1943, 1944 (c)
Munster Senior Hurling Championship (3): 1942, 1944, 1947
All-Ireland Junior Football Championship: 1951
Munster Junior Football Championship: 1951
All-Ireland Minor Hurling Championship: 1941 (c)
Munster Minor Hurling Championship: 1941 (c)

Munster
Railway Cup: 1944 (c)

Personal life
Following his retirement from hurling, he got married and fathered three children. He remained a friend of Taoiseach Jack Lynch, his former Cork teammate, and canvassed for him in The Lough during the 1966 general election.

References

1923 births
2001 deaths
St Finbarr's hurlers
Cork inter-county hurlers
Munster inter-provincial hurlers
All-Ireland Senior Hurling Championship winners